John Conway Harrison (April 28, 1913 – November 11, 2011) was the longest-serving Associate Justice of the Montana Supreme Court, holding that office from 1961 to 1995.

Born in Grand Rapids, Minnesota, his family moved to Harlowton, Montana in 1928. Harrison received his J.D. from the George Washington University Law School in 1940, and served in the United States Army during World War II, from 1940 to 1946. After the war, he joined the Army Reserves, achieving the rank of colonel. He served as County Attorney of Lewis and Clark County, Montana, from 1954 to 1960, when he was elected to the Montana Supreme Court.

In August 1941, Harrison married Virginia Flanagan, with whom he had three sons and three daughters. Virginia died in 1984, and in 1987 he married Ethel Harrison. Harrison died in Helena, Montana, at the age of 98.

References

External links 

1913 births
2011 deaths
Justices of the Montana Supreme Court
People from Grand Rapids, Minnesota
George Washington University Law School alumni
United States Army personnel of World War II